"Not Going Down" is a song recorded by American country music artist Jo Dee Messina.  It was released in December 2005 as the third single from the album Delicious Surprise.  The song reached #28 on the Billboard Hot Country Songs chart.  The song was written by Kevin Savigar and Shaunn Bolton.

Chart performance

References

2005 singles
2005 songs
Jo Dee Messina songs
Songs written by Kevin Savigar
Song recordings produced by Byron Gallimore
Curb Records singles